The Thracian tomb at Shushmanets is a mound located in the Valley of the Thracian Rulers. It was built as a temple in the 4th century BC and later used as a tomb.

Architecture
The temple has a long and wide entry corridor and an antechamber, a semi-cylindrical room supported by an elegant column. The top of this column has the form of a knucklebone. Four horses and two dogs were sacrificed in the antechamber. The central room is circular in shape, supported by a beautiful polished Doric column ending with a large disc symbolizing the sun. The tomb's columns represent Thracian beliefs about the universe and the creation myth. Archaeologist Georgi Kitov discovered the tomb in 1996.

See also
Thracian tomb of Aleksandrovo
Thracian tomb of Cotys I
Thracian tomb Golyama Arsenalka
Thracian tomb Griffins
Thracian tomb Helvetia
Thracian Tomb of Kazanlak
Thracian tomb Ostrusha
Thracian tomb of Seuthes III
Thracian Tomb of Sveshtari
Valley of the Thracian Rulers
Roman Tomb (Silistra)

Tombs in Bulgaria
Thracian sites

References

Tombs in Bulgaria
Thracian sites
History of Stara Zagora Province